This list of majority-Hispanic or Latino counties in the United States covers the counties and county-equivalents in the 50 U.S. states, the District of Columbia, and the territory of Puerto Rico and the population in each county that is either Hispanic or Latino.

The data sources for the list are the 2020 United States Census and the 2010 United States Census.

At the time of the 2020 Census, there were 65.3 million Americans who were Hispanic or Latino, making up 19.5% of the U.S. population. State by state, the highest number of Hispanic Americans could be found in California (15.58 million), Texas (11.44 million), Florida (5.70 million), New York (3.95 million), and Puerto Rico (3.25 million). Meanwhile, the highest proportions of Hispanic Americans were in Puerto Rico (98.88%), New Mexico (47.74%), California (39.40%), Texas (39.26%), and Arizona (30.65%).

Throughout the country, there are 179 county-equivalents where over 50% of the population are either Hispanic or Latino. 78 of these were Puerto Rican municipalities, and 61 more were counties in Texas. Moreover, there were 13 counties in New Mexico and 11 counties in California with Hispanic majorities. Kansas has four Hispanic-majority counties, Florida and Washington both have three, Arizona and Colorado both have two, and Oklahoma and New York state each have one Hispanic-majority county.

In 2020, the most populated counties which had a Hispanic majority were Miami-Dade County, Florida (population 2.70 million), San Bernardino County, California (population 2.18 million), Bexar County, Texas (population 2.01 million), Bronx County, New York (population 1.47 million), and Fresno County, California (population 1.01 million).

List

The list below displays each majority-Hispanic county (or county-equivalent) in the fifty U.S. states, the District of Columbia, and Puerto Rico. It includes the county's total population, the number of Hispanic people in the county, and the percentage of people in the county who are Hispanic all as of the 2020 Census as well as these same statistics for the 2010 Census. You can also see percentage change of all these values between the two censuses. The table is initially sorted by the Hispanic proportion of each county in 2020 but is sortable by any of its columns, as can be found by clicking the table headers.

Counties in Puerto Rico are shaded in yellow.

See also
 Hispanic and Latino Americans
 List of U.S. states by Hispanic and Latino population
 List of U.S. cities with large Hispanic and Latino populations
 List of U.S. counties with African-American majority populations

References

Lists of counties of the United States
Lists of United States populated places by ethnic group